Radial Road 9, more commonly referred to as R-9, is a network of roads and bridges that all together form the ninth radial road of Manila in the Philippines. It is the westernmost of the radial roads north of the Pasig River that actually lead to the provinces. The road links the City of Manila with Caloocan, Malabon and Valenzuela in the north, leading out of Metro Manila into the provinces of Bulacan, Pampanga, Tarlac, Pangasinan, and La Union.

Route
The road consists of the following segments:

Rizal Avenue

Between the Pasig River front of the district of Santa Cruz and the Monumento Roundabout at the intersection with Epifanio de los Santos Avenue (EDSA) in Caloocan, R-9 is known as Rizal Avenue. It runs underneath the LRT Line 1 (Line 1).

MacArthur Highway

R-9 becomes the MacArthur Highway after crossing the intersection of EDSA and Samson Road at the Monumento Roundabout. It connects South Caloocan with Malabon and Valenzuela running parallel to the North Luzon Expressway (R-8) to the east. The highway crosses into the Central Luzon provinces of Bulacan, Pampanga, Tarlac, Pangasinan, and La Union, where it is also known as the Manila North Road. The R-9 segment of the road terminates at the junction with Kennon Road in Rosario.

See also
 List of roads in Metro Manila

References

Routes in Metro Manila